The 1976 Northwestern Wildcats team represented Northwestern University during the 1976 Big Ten Conference football season. In their fourth year under head coach John Pont, the Wildcats compiled a 1–10 record (1–7 against Big Ten Conference opponents) and finished in last place in the Big Ten Conference.

The team's offensive leaders were quarterback Randy Dean with 1,384 passing yards, Pat Geegan with 537 rushing yards, and Scott Yelvington with 649 receiving yards. Yelvington received first-team All-Big Ten honors from both the Associated Press and the United Press International.

Schedule

Roster

References

Northwestern
Northwestern Wildcats football seasons
Northwestern Wildcats football